Cyborg is a 1989 American martial-arts cyberpunk film directed by Albert Pyun. Jean-Claude van Damme stars as Gibson Rickenbacker, a mercenary who battles a group of murderous marauders led by Fender Tremolo (Vincent Klyn) along the East coast of the United States in a post-apocalyptic future. It was followed by the sequels Cyborg 2 (1993) and Cyborg 3: The Recycler (1994).

Plot
A plague known as the living death cripples civilization. A small group of surviving scientists and doctors — located in Atlanta, home of the CDC — work on a cure to save what remains of humanity. To complete their work they need information stored on a computer system in New York City. Pearl Prophet volunteers for the dangerous courier mission and is made into a cyborg through surgical augmentation.

Pearl, accompanied by bodyguard Marshall Strat, retrieves the data in New York but is pursued by the vicious Fender Tremolo and his gang of pirates. Fender wants the cure so he can have a monopoly on its production. Strat, badly injured while fighting the pirates, tells Pearl to leave him and find a mercenary, known as a "slinger", who can escort her to safety. She gets cornered but is saved by a slinger named Gibson Rickenbacker. After she explains her situation, they are overrun by Fender's gang, and Gibson is knocked out by falling debris. Fender demands that she accompany him to Atlanta or die.

Fender's gang slaughters a family and steals their boat. They head south for Atlanta via the Intracoastal Waterway with the captive Pearl. Gibson, who had been tracking the pirates, arrives at the scene of slaughter later that night. A shadowy figure attacks him, but he disables her. She turns out to be Nady Simmons, a young woman who mistook him as a pirate. Nady, whose family was wiped out by the plague, joins Gibson. Gibson is less concerned with a cure for the plague than with killing Fender. Gibson and Nady trek southward through the wastelands, where bandits ambush them. Concerned for Nady, Gibson unsuccessfully attempts to convince her to stay away. After declining sex with Nady, Gibson reveals that all he cares about is revenge against Fender, who killed his lover and destroyed his chance to have a normal life and family.

Intercepting Fender and his crew near Charleston, South Carolina, Gibson defeats most of his men, but Fender shoots him with an air rifle. Now nursing a gunshot wound, Gibson realizes Haley (his dead lover's younger sister whom Fender kidnapped) is now a loyal member of Fender's crew. He flees the pirates and ends up alone with Pearl and Nady. Pearl refuses to go with him — she calculates that Gibson is not strong enough to defeat Fender and will be unable to get her to Atlanta safely. She says she will go along with Fender and lure him to his death in Atlanta, where she has resources at her disposal.

Tired, wounded and badly outnumbered, Gibson flees with Nady through the sewer into a salt marsh, where they are pursued by the rest of the pirates and eventually separated from each other. Gibson is thoroughly beaten by Fender and crucified high on the mast of a beached, derelict ship. Haley lingers at the scene but still leaves with Fender. Gibson spends the night on the cross. In the morning, near death, he kicks the mast repeatedly with his dangling foot in a last fit of rage. The mast snaps, sending him crashing to the ground, his arms still tied and nailed to the cross. Finally, Nady appears out of the marsh to free him.

Gibson and Nady intercept Fender once again in Atlanta, this time better prepared. Fender's gang is taken down one by one until he and Gibson face off. During their fight, Nady rushes Fender with a knife, but he stabs and kills her. Gibson in turn stabs Fender in the chest. Thinking him dead, Gibson embraces Haley, who, during the battle turned decisively against Fender. However, Fender gets back up, and they continue to battle in a nearby shed, where Gibson finally kills Fender by impaling him on a meat hook. Gibson and Haley escort Pearl to her final destination before heading back off.

Cast
 Jean-Claude van Damme as Gibson Rickenbacker
 Deborah Richter as Nady Simmons
 Vincent Klyn as Fender Tremolo
 Dayle Haddon as Pearl Prophet
 Alex Daniels as Marshall Strat
 Blaise Loong as Furman Vux / Pirate / Bandit
 Ralf Möller as Brick Bardo (credited as Rolf Muller)
 Haley Peterson as Haley
 Terrie Batson as Mary
 Jackson 'Rock' Pinckney as Tytus / Pirate

Production
Cannon Films initially intended to make a sequel to the 1987 He-Man film Masters of the Universe and a live-action Spider-Man film. Both projects were planned to be shot simultaneously by Albert Pyun. Cannon, however, was in financial trouble and had to cancel deals with both Mattel and Marvel Entertainment Group, the owners of He-Man and Spider-Man, respectively. Cannon had already spent $2 million on costumes and sets for both films and decided to start a new project in order to recoup that money. Pyun wrote the storyline for Cyborg in one weekend. Pyun had Chuck Norris in mind for the lead, but co-producer Menahem Golan cast Jean-Claude van Damme. The film was shot for less than $500,000 and was filmed in 23 days. The film was shot entirely in Wilmington, North Carolina.

Several of the characters' names are references to well-known manufacturers and models of guitars and other musical instruments:
 Gibson Rickenbacker: Gibson, Rickenbacker
 Fender Tremolo: Fender, Tremolo arm
 Marshall Strat: Marshall Amplifiers, Fender Stratocaster
 Les: Gibson Les Paul
 Pearl Prophet: Pearl drums, Prophet 5 synthesizer
 Nady Simmons: Nady Systems, Inc. and Simmons electric drums

After the success of Bloodsport, Cannon films offered Jean-Claude van Damme the lead in Delta Force 2, American Ninja 3 or Cyborg. He chose the latter although he later admitted that he did not like that film so much.

Jackson "Rock" Pinckney, who played one of Fender's pirates, lost an eye during filming when Jean-Claude van Damme accidentally struck his eye with a prop knife. Pinckney sued Van Damme in a North Carolina court and was awarded $485,000.

Violent scenes were heavily cut to gain an R rating rather than an X, including a throat-slitting and some blood and gore during the village massacre. Also excised was the death of a man Van Damme was fighting, which caused an inconsistency that made him look like he suddenly disappeared.

Release
Cyborg was released in the United States on April 7, 1989. In the Philippines, the film was rereleased as First Hero on August 16, 1995, with "Re Issue" written in small print within the credits of the poster.

Comic book
To coincide with the film's home video release, Cannon published a one-shot comic book. Narration largely follows the action of the film, although the final fight ends on a cliffhanger. Credited to author Noah Sirk and artists Mike Van Cleave and Pete Von Sholly, it also features behind-the-scenes articles and interviews. The comic was reprinted for limited editions of the film published by French company ESC and Austrian-German company Plaion.

Critical response
Cyborg received a generally negative reception from critics despite the box office success. Review aggregator Rotten Tomatoes reports a 22% positive score based on 18 reviews and an average rating of 3.5/10. On Metacritic the film has a weighted average score of 24 out of 100, based on 8 critics, indicating "generally unfavorable reviews". The film debuted at number four at the American box office and went on to gross $10,166,459.

Legacy

Sequels
Cyborg 2, starring Elias Koteas and Angelina Jolie, was released in 1993. Cyborg 3: The Recycler, a direct-to-video release, followed in 1995. Both films bear little to no relation to the first film and were heavily panned by critics, even more than the original.

Alternate cut
In 2011, director Albert Pyun's Curnan Pictures got hold of the missing tapes of the original cut of Cyborg through Pyun's original choice for score artist, Tony Riparetti. This director's cut of the film features Pyun's editing and previously unreleased scenes. It is commercially available through the director himself. Pyun's director's cut was released in 2014 in Germany with the film's original title "Slinger".

In popular culture
American rapper Method Man sampled most of Fender's opening words as the opening lyrics in the song "Judgement Day" from his 1998 album Tical 2000: Judgement Day. The lyrics are slightly modified. The intro is also in the opening of the song "World Damnation" by the death metal band Mortician. The intro of Fender talking about death and starvation is thought as the official opening of metal band Chimairas' song "Resurrection". It is often played at live shows as an intro. The same intro is also played the beginning of a song by Australian, Christian, gore-grindcore band Vomitorial Corpulence.

References

External links
 
 
 
 

1989 films
1989 martial arts films
1980s American films
1980s English-language films
1980s science fiction action films
American films about revenge
American post-apocalyptic films
American science fiction action films
Cyberpunk films
Cyborg (film series)
Cyborg films
Films directed by Albert Pyun
Films produced by Menahem Golan
Films produced by Yoram Globus
Films set in Atlanta
Films set in Charleston, South Carolina
Films shot in New York (state)
Films shot in North Carolina
Golan-Globus films
Martial arts science fiction films